Improvement District No. 4, or Improvement District No. 04 (Waterton), is an improvement district in Alberta, Canada. Coextensive with Waterton Lakes National Park in southern Alberta, the improvement district provides local governance for lands within the park that are not within an Indian reserve.

History 
Prior to 1944, those lands within Improvement District (ID) No. 4 were split between the Municipal District of Kerr No. 39 and the Municipal District of Castle River No. 40. Following a partial amalgamation of the two municipal districts, remnant unsurveyed lands were incorporated as ID No. 11 on January 1, 1944. It was renumbered to ID No. 8 on April 1, 1945 and again to ID No. 4 on January 1, 1969.

Geography

Communities and localities 
While there are no urban municipalities within Improvement District No. 4 there is one hamlet named Waterton Park. Blood 148A, a First Nation reserve of the Kainai Nation, is also within Improvement District No. 4.

The following localities are within Improvement District No. 4.
Localities
Chief Mountain
Waterton Lakes National Park

Demographics 

The population of Improvement District No. 24 according to its 2018 municipal census is 108. The municipal census also counted a shadow population – temporary residents employed in the municipality – of 405 for a combined population of 513.

Government 
Improvement District No. 4 is governed by a five-person council comprising a chair and four councillors. Ken Black is the chair of the council.

See also 
List of communities in Alberta

References

External links 

1944 establishments in Alberta
Waterton Lakes National Park

04